Isidore Goudeket (1 August 1883 in Amsterdam – 9 July 1943 in Sobibor extermination camp, Poland) was a Dutch gymnast who competed in the 1908 Summer Olympics. He was part of the Dutch gymnastics team, which finished seventh in the team event. In the individual all-around competition he finished 62nd.

He was murdered in the Sobibor extermination camp.

References

1883 births
1943 deaths
Dutch Jews who died in the Holocaust
Dutch male artistic gymnasts
Jewish Dutch sportspeople
Gymnasts at the 1908 Summer Olympics
Olympic gymnasts of the Netherlands
Gymnasts from Amsterdam
Dutch civilians killed in World War II
Dutch people who died in Sobibor extermination camp